The Tadjikistan even-fingered gecko (Alsophylax tadjikiensis) is a species of gecko found in Tajikistan.

References

Alsophylax
Reptiles described in 1979